"I Really Like It" is the lead single from rap group Harlem World's debut album, The Movement. It featured the groups mentor Mase and R&B singer, Kelly Price and was produced by Mase, Supa Sam and Just Blaze. the track contains a sample of "Popcorn Love" performed by New Edition and contains an interpolation of I Like It performed by DeBarge. "I Really Like It" managed to make it to 3 different Billboard charts having peaked at 61 on the Hot R&B/Hip-Hop Singles & Tracks, 31 on the Hot Rap Singles and 18 on the Rhythmic Top 40.

Single track listing

A-Side
"I Really Like It"- 3:53  
"I Really Like It" (Instrumental)- 3:50

B-Side
"Meaning of Family"- 4:12  
"Meaning of Family" (Instrumental)- 4:13

1999 debut singles
Mase songs
Song recordings produced by Just Blaze
1999 songs
So So Def Recordings singles
Songs written by Mase
Songs written by Just Blaze
Songs written by El DeBarge
Songs written by Maurice Starr
Songs written by Michael Jonzun